The Circuit is a 2008 American TV film starring Michelle Trachtenberg, Billy Campbell, Paul Rae, Drew Fuller and Maurice Dean Wint, originally airing on June 8, 2008, on the ABC Family channel.

Plot
Beautiful Kylie Shines rising stock-car racer competes against her estranged father and her new love. The final race is between Kylie and Al and Kid Walker, Walker crashes. Kylie wins.

Cast

References

External links

2008 television films
2008 films
ABC Family original films
Canadian auto racing films
2000s English-language films
Canadian television films
English-language Canadian films
Films directed by Peter Werner
2000s Canadian films